Mikhail Tarasov may refer to:

 Svoy (Mikhail Tarasov, born 1980), American producer/writer/artist
 Mikhail Tarasov (canoeist) (born 1981), Uzbekistani sprint canoer